Stenomorda is a genus of beetles in the family Mordellidae, containing the following species:

 Stenomorda fasciata Ermisch, 1968
 Stenomorda flavipes Ermisch, 1968
 Stenomorda notoensis Pic, 1921
 Stenomorda tetraspilota (Fairmaire, 1895)
 Stenomorda vittatipennis (Pic, 1931)

References

Mordellidae